Lendava Synagogue is a former synagogue, currently a museum. It is located in the small town of Lendava, Slovenia, close to the Hungarian border. It was built in the 18th century and today has a permanent exhibition on the History of Jews in Lendava. Near the synagogue was a Jewish school, which functioned until the 1920s and was demolished in the end of the 1990s to allow the construction of a Hungarian cultural centre and a cemetery with 176 tombstones, about 40 from the second half of the 19th century, most of the rest from the 20th century near the village of Dolga Vas, just outside town.

History 

Jews from Hungary settled in Lendava in 1773. Local Jews at the end of the 18th century gathered to pray at the home of the innkeeper Bodog Weisz. In 1837, the community rented a house for use as a prayer hall, which had 50 seats. In 1843, the community rented and then purchased another building, which was their first real synagogue.

Construction on a new synagogue began in 1866, and this building still stands in the center of town at Spodnja ulica 5. It is a boxy, rectangular brick structure with a peaked roof. The corners are decorated with slightly raised, flat false pilasters. Heavily damaged by the Germans, the building was sold to the town after the 2nd war by the Jewish Federation of Yugoslavia and was used as a warehouse.

Work began in 1994 to renovate the synagogue for use as a culture center which will also have an exhibition on local Jewish history in the women's gallery. The only original interior decorative elements remaining in the building are six fluted cast iron pillars supporting a rebuilt gallery, plus stairway railings and a small niche in the stairwell. The one-time circular (rose) window over the Ark has been changed into an arched window, and two of the arched side windows (which exist on the south side only) have been lengthened and enlarged. The third (left hand) window on the south side has been left at apparently its original shape and size. There is also an arched window over the door in the West side.

See also 

 History of the Jews in Slovenia
 Maribor Synagogue
 Ptuj Synagogue
 Ljubljana Synagogue

References

External links 

 Jewish Monuments in Slovenia
 Jews and antisemitism in Slovenia

Former synagogues in Slovenia
History museums in Slovenia
Jewish Slovenian history
Synagogue
Synagogues preserved as museums
Jewish museums
Prekmurje
18th-century synagogues